Tristan Shane Hammond (born 5 January 2003) is an Australian soccer player who plays as a winger or forward for the Austrian club Austria Wien II.

Career

Club career

At the age of 11, Hammond joined the youth academy of Portuguese side Belenenses. After that, he joined the youth academy of Sporting, one of the most successful clubs in Portugal. In 2021, he signed for Austrian second division team Austria Wien II. On 27 August 2021, Hammond debuted for Austria Wien II during a 0–2 loss to St. Pölten.

International career

He represented Australia at the 2019 FIFA U-17 World Cup. Hammond is eligible to represent Peru internationally through his mother.

Personal life

He has a younger brother Aydan Hammond who currently plays youth football for Beleneneses

References

External links
 Tristan Hammond at playmakerstats.com
 

Expatriate footballers in Portugal
Australian expatriate sportspeople in Portugal
2003 births
Sporting CP footballers
FK Austria Wien players
2. Liga (Austria) players
Australian people of Peruvian descent
Expatriate footballers in Austria
Living people
Association football wingers
Association football forwards
Australian expatriate sportspeople in Austria
Australian soccer players
Australian expatriate soccer players